Justice Christine French is a judge of the Court of Appeal, New Zealand. She was appointed in 2012, having been a judge of the High Court since 2008.

She has degrees from the University of Otago (1981) and Oxford University (1983), studying at the latter as a Rhodes scholar.

In 2014 she received an honorary doctorate from the University of Otago.

References 

Year of birth missing (living people)
Living people
University of Otago alumni
Alumni of the University of Oxford
New Zealand Rhodes Scholars
New Zealand women judges
Court of Appeal of New Zealand judges